Figures Don't Lie is a 1927 American silent comedy film directed by A. Edward Sutherland and written by Ethel Doherty, Grover Jones, Louise Long, Herman J. Mankiewicz, and B. F. Zeidman. The film stars Esther Ralston, Richard Arlen, Ford Sterling, Doris Hill, Blanche Payson, and Natalie Kingston. The film was released on October 9, 1927, by Paramount Pictures.

Cast
Esther Ralston as Janet Wells
Richard Arlen as Bob Blewe
Ford Sterling as 'Howdy' Jones
Doris Hill as Mamie
Blanche Payson as Mrs. Jones
Natalie Kingston as Dolores

Preservation status
The film is now lost.

References

External links

1927 films
1920s English-language films
Silent American comedy films
1927 comedy films
Paramount Pictures films
Films directed by A. Edward Sutherland
American black-and-white films
American silent feature films
Lost American films
1927 lost films
Lost comedy films
1920s American films